Lago Piatto (Italian lago lake, piatto plate, "plate lake") is a lake in the Province of Pistoia, Tuscany, Italy.

Lakes of Tuscany